Richard D. Cummings is an American biochemist who is the S. Daniel Abraham Professor of Surgery at Beth Israel Deaconess Medical Center and Harvard Medical School in Boston, MA. He also the Chief of the Division of Surgical Sciences within the Department of Surgery.  He is  the Director of the Harvard Medical School Center for Glycoscience, Director of the National Center for Functional Glycomics, and also founder of the Glycomics Core at BIDMC.  As of 2018 Cummings is also the Scientific Director of the Feihi Nutrition Laboratory at BIDMC.  Before moving to BIDMC/HMS, Cummings was the William Patterson Timmie Professor and Chair of the Department of Biochemistry at Emory University School of Medicine in Atlanta, Georgia from 2006-2015. At Emory, Cummings was a founder in 2007 of the Emory Glycomics Center.

Education 
Cummings graduated from Isabella High School near Maplesville, AL and received his B.S. in biology and chemistry from the University of Montevallo in Montevallo, AL. He received his Ph.D. in biology (biochemistry) from The Johns Hopkins University in Baltimore, MD, where he trained with Stephen A. Roth, and was a postdoctoral Fellow in the Division of Hematology/Oncology at Washington University School of Medicine, where he trained with Stuart A. Kornfeld.

Career and research 
Cummings was Professor of Biochemistry and Molecular Biology at the University of Georgia in Athens from 1983-1992 and Associate Director of the Complex Carbohydrate Research Center.

Cummings was the Ed Miller Endowed Chair in Molecular Biology, the George Lynn Cross Professor in Biochemistry, and Professor of Biochemistry and Molecular Biology at the University of Oklahoma Health Sciences Center, College of Medicine, in Oklahoma City, Oklahoma from 1992-2006. He was the founder in 1999 of the Oklahoma Center for Medical Glycobiology.

Cummings was a co-founder in 2002, along with Rodger P. McEver and Richard Alvarez, of Selexys Pharmaceuticals Corporation, where he initially served as President and Chief Scientific Officer.  Selexys was based in Oklahoma City, Oklahoma.  The emphasis of the company was in developing treatments for inflammatory disorders. In November 21, 2016 it was announced that Selexys was purchased by Novartis.  The purchase occurred following receipt of results of the SUSTAIN study, a Phase II trial evaluating the use of SelG1, an anti-P-selectin antibody, in the reduction of vaso-occlusive pain crises in patients with sickle cell disease (SCD).

Cummings was also a co-founder in 2014 of Tetherex Pharmaceuticals, a spinoff of Selexys in Oklahoma City, that is developing novel first-in-class therapeutics targeting cell adhesion proteins in inflammatory and oncologic diseases. In 1988 he was a founder of ELA Technologies, Inc. in Athens, Georgia, that specialized in developing uses of bioluminescent proteins in high-sensitivity detection assays.

Research
Cummings is a co-founder of the fields of glycomics and glycobiology.  His research, which has been funded by the National Institutes of Health since 1984, has focused on the biochemical and molecular regulation of cellular metabolism and function.  His work emphasizes the roles of glycoconjugates in cell adhesion and cell signaling.  In his biochemical studies he is exploring the fundamental pathways of glycoconjugate biosynthesis and alterations in biosynthesis in human and animal diseases.  He is also exploring the roles of proteins and lectins that recognize glycans, as well as anti-glycan antibodies, in biological pathways and disease, including inflammation, autoimmunity, infectious diseases, and cancer.  Cummings has over 330 peer-reviewed publications in the field. Among his notable discoveries are the immunogenic glycans in parasitic helminths, the nature of the sulfated and glycosylated ligand PSGL-1 for selectins, the molecular chaperone COSMC (C1GalT1C1) that regulates T-synthase activity and consequently O-glycosylation pathways, and the roles of glycans in regulating leukocyte trafficking.

Appointments and awards 
Cummings is an elected Fellow of the American Association for the Advancement of Science (2014), member of Sigma Xi (2020) and a past President of the Society for Glycobiology (2001).  In 2008 he received the Karl Meyer Award from the Society for Glycobiology and in 2019 he received the IGO Award from the International Glycoconjugate Organization, all in recognition of his contributions to glycosciences. Cummings is the Chair of the Steering Committee for the Consortium of Functional Glycomics, a worldwide organization that is a comprehensive resource for functional glycomics.  Cummings is the Director of the National Center for Functional Glycomics, which relocated in 2015 from Emory to BIDMC/HMS, and develops and offers a variety of glycan microarray technologies for researchers in the field. Cummings is also co-Director of the Human Glycome Project, a world-wide effort to identify and functionally characterize the components of the human glycome.

Publications 
Cummings is a co-Editor of the 1st Edition of Essentials of Glycobiology (1999), the 2nd Edition (2009) of Essentials of Glycobiology, the 3rd Edition (2017) of Essentials of Glycobiology, and now the 4th Edition (2022) of Essentials of Glycobiology, the first textbook in the field of glycobiology. Cummings was also the artwork editor for the textbook and prepared most of the illustrations.  This textbook in 2003 became one of the pioneering textbooks to be distributed electronically by the National Library of Medicine. Cummings is also a co-editor of Handbook of Glycomics, which provides a comprehensive overview of the emerging field of glycomics, and a co-editor of Galectins:  Methods and Protocols.  In addition, Cummings currently has 32 US Patents in the field of biotechnology and glycobiology.

References

American biochemists
Emory University faculty
University of Oklahoma faculty
Harvard Medical School faculty
Johns Hopkins University alumni
Year of birth missing (living people)
Living people
Place of birth missing (living people)
Washington University in St. Louis fellows